Pamela Askew (February 2, 1925 – June 24, 1997) was an American art historian who wrote influential works on Domenico Fetti and Caravaggio.

Askew's father was Arthur McComb, Professor of baroque art at Vassar College and Harvard University, and author of the influential Agnolo Bronzino: His Life and Works (1928). She grew up in New York City with her mother, Constance, and step-father, R. Kirk Askew Jr., a Park Avenue art dealer.

She did undergraduate studies at Vassar College, followed by an MA in Art History at the New York University Institute of Fine Arts, with a thesis on Perino del Vaga. She took her Ph.D. from the Courtauld Institute of Art, London, in 1954, under Johannes Wilde with work on Domenico Fetti.

On 26 March 1955, she married Timothy John Oswald Mosley, an Englishman educated at Eton College, who had served in the Coldstream Guards. She returned to teach at Vassar, becoming a full professor in 1969. She died of lymphoma in 1997.

Selected works

Books

Scholarly articles

References

1925 births
1997 deaths
American art historians
20th-century American historians
Women art historians
Alumni of the Courtauld Institute of Art
20th-century American women writers
American women historians